Jaroslav Soukup (born 12 July 1982) is a retired Czech biathlete.

Career
His first World Cup podium was in Östersund at the pursuit competition on 4 December 2011.

Soukup won a bronze medal in biathlon at the 2014 Winter Olympics in sprint and a silver medal in the Mixed relay (together with Ondřej Moravec, Gabriela Soukalová and Veronika Vítková).

Olympic Games

World Championships
2 medals (2 bronze)

References

External links

1982 births
Living people
Czech male biathletes
Biathletes at the 2010 Winter Olympics
Biathletes at the 2014 Winter Olympics
Biathletes at the 2018 Winter Olympics
Olympic biathletes of the Czech Republic
Medalists at the 2014 Winter Olympics
Olympic medalists in biathlon
Olympic silver medalists for the Czech Republic
Olympic bronze medalists for the Czech Republic
Biathlon World Championships medalists
Universiade medalists in biathlon
People from Jičín
Universiade bronze medalists for the Czech Republic
Competitors at the 2005 Winter Universiade
Competitors at the 2007 Winter Universiade
Competitors at the 2009 Winter Universiade
Sportspeople from the Hradec Králové Region